James Daniel Stewart (December 6, 1906 – January 20, 1991) was an American decathlete. He competed at the 1928 Summer Olympics and finished fourth. He placed second at the AAU championships in 1928 and 1930 and fourth in 1927.

References

American male decathletes
1906 births
1991 deaths
Olympic track and field athletes of the United States
Athletes (track and field) at the 1928 Summer Olympics
Track and field athletes from Texas
People from Ward County, Texas